Max Haines (January 4, 1931 – September 30, 2017) was a Canadian true crime newspaper columnist and author, widely syndicated internationally.

Max Haines was born in Antigonish, Nova Scotia, to Jewish parents, Alexander and Augusta (Rich) Haines, and attended Morrison High School there. He began researching murders from around the world, past and present, as a hobby. His "Crime Flashback" column made its debut in the Toronto Sun in 1972 with a column about Lizzie Borden. Over the next 35 years, he researched over 2,000 crimes and his "Crime Flashback" column was syndicated across Canada and in several Latin and South American countries. He also wrote 27 true crime books and a memoir, The Spitting Champion of the World, about growing up in Nova Scotia. Readership of his syndicated column was over 3 million per week.  He lived in Toronto, Ontario with his wife Marilyn. He retired in 2006.

In 2005, he was awarded the Derrick Murdoch Award, one of the Arthur Ellis awards, by the Crime Writers of Canada.

Haines died from progressive supranuclear palsy (PSP) on September 30, 2017, aged 86.

References

1931 births
2017 deaths
Canadian crime writers
Non-fiction crime writers
People from Antigonish, Nova Scotia
Canadian columnists
Jewish Canadian journalists
Toronto Sun people